Mount Isa is a city in the Gulf Country region of Queensland, Australia. It came into existence because of the vast mineral deposits found in the area. Mount Isa Mines (MIM) is one of the most productive single mines in world history, based on combined production of lead, silver, copper and zinc.

With an urban population of 19,226 in 2021 census, Mount Isa is the administrative, commercial and industrial centre for the state's vast north-western region. Locals often refer to Mount Isa as "The Isa".

Due to the lead production in the city, Mount Isa has one of the most intensive air quality monitoring systems in Australia. Concerns have been raised over childhood lead contamination and air pollution within the city. The Mount Isa Mines (MIM) in particular are a source of significant lead pollution.

Geography 

The Leichhardt River divides the city into areas known as "mineside" and "townside". Xstrata, the power station and the Airport are on the mineside, whilst the majority of the city, including the CBD and Base Hospital are on the townside. In recent years, population increases associated with the mining boom has increased demand for accommodation and land.  The city had spread out, with new suburbs in the south-east and north of the city being planned or developed. Planned expansions can cater for more than 40,000 people.

 Mineside
Happy Valley - includes Happy Valley State School, St Joseph's Catholic Primary School, and Captain James Cook Park
Kalkadoon - includes Mount Isa Airport and Kalkadoon Park
 Mica Creek – includes CS Energy Mica Creek Power Station
 Miles End - includes Mount Isa Civic Centre and railway station
 Parkside – Mount Isa's largest and oldest suburb. Contains the Irish Club, Parkside Flats complex, and Playway Park
 Soldiers Hill – All streets and parks named after war locations and soldiers, such as Kokoda Road and Gallipoli Park
 Hilton - More commonly known as Mineside, on the same side of the railway line as Mount Isa Mines and the Incitec Pivot Sulphuric Acid plant. Employee housing, particularly for managers and visiting staff from Xstrata, Casa Grande; a white brick mansion built for the visit of Queen Elizabeth II; now used for the annual Casa Grande Ball, and some mine operations.

 Townside
 Breakaway - Semi-rural acreages
 Fisher
 Healy - Residential suburb, site of Healy State School
 Lanskey
 Menzies – includes Buchanan Park events complex, Stables and Racecourse.
 Mornington
 Mount Isa City - The Central Business District
 Mount Isa East – has own post office and smaller shopping centres
 Pioneer – includes a campus of TAFE Queensland North, Spinifex Senior Campus and Ten-Pin Bowling complex, St Kierans Catholic Primary School
 Ryan – mostly industrial, includes army and State Emergency Service barracks, home to one company of the 51st Battalion, Far North Queensland Regiment
 Spreadborough - mostly bushland and light industry. The notable Spreadborough family still resides in the area.
 Sunset - Home to Sunset State Primary School, and some shopping facilities
 The Gap
 Townview - Home to Townview State Primary School
 Winston

History 

Mount Isa is located on the traditional land of the Kalkadoon people. The endemic language of the area was Kalkatunga (also known as Kalkadoon, Kalkadunga, Kalkatungu).

They first came into contact with advancing European pastoralists and miners in the mid 1860s, following the Burke and Wills expedition to the Cape York Peninsula in 1861. As settlers and prospectors pressed further into their lands the Kalkadoon set out on one of Australia's most successful guerrilla wars, now known as the Kalkadoon Wars which took place from about 1871 to 1884. Their success continued until at Battle Mountain in 1884, when Kalkadoon people killed five Native Police and a prominent pastoralist. Only 29 Kalkadoon people survived. In response, the Queensland Government sending a large contingent of heavily armed patrols who chased surviving tribe members. It is estimated that 900 Kalkadoon people were killed during this six-year campaign. There is now a memorial near the site of the Black Mountain.

In 1923, a lone prospector, John Campbell Miles, stumbled upon one of the world's richest deposits of copper, silver and zinc during an expedition into the Northern Territory. When Miles inspected the yellow-black rocks in a nearby outcrop, they reminded him of the ore found in the Broken Hill mine that he had once worked at. Upon inspection these rocks were weighty and heavily mineralised. A sample sent away to the assayer in Cloncurry confirmed their value. Miles and four farmers staked out the first claims in the area. Taken with friend's stories of the Mount Ida gold mines in Western Australia, Miles decided upon Mount Isa as the name for his new claim.Mount Isa Post Office opened on 1 August 1924.A location for the town's hospital was chosen in 1929, with a small building completed the following year.  In 1931, a larger structure was moved to the site from the closed mining town of Kuridala.In 1970, Queen Elizabeth II, The Duke of Edinburgh and Princess Anne toured Australia including Queensland. The Queensland tour began on Sunday 12 April when the royal yacht Britannia entered Moreton Bay at Caloundra, sailing into Newstead Wharf. After visiting Brisbane and Longreach next on the tour was Mount Isa and while there the royals were driven to Kalkadoon Park where the royal couple witnessed a programmed event under the guidance of Ringmaster Mr. J. O’Shea. Kalkadoon Park was the original site of the famous Mount Isa rodeo. The following day, on 16 April, the Duke of Edinburgh was taken on an underground tour of the Mount Isa mine while Queen Elizabeth stayed above ground. The Marshalling Area around R62 Shaft Winder Tower was cleaned, and a display was set up using operational mining equipment from underground so Queen Elizabeth II could see it in action. The display was designed to demonstrate the operation of an EIMCO air powered rail mounted rocker shovel loading ore.

The Mount Isa City Library opened in 1974.

In 2008, plans were made to build a massive motor sports complex on the city's north-eastern outskirts, but as of 2016 it had not been built.

In 2008 a Queensland Health report found that more than 10% of children in Mount Isa had blood lead levels above World Health Organization recommendations. The mining operator Glencore denied responsibility and stated that the town has naturally high levels of lead in the soil. However, a more recent study led by Macquarie University environmental engineers has used lead isotope analysis to show conclusively that the lead ingested had originated from smelted ore and not surface deposits.

In 2008, a rumour circulated that the ratio of males to females living in Mount Isa was five to one. Former Mayor John Molony drew international press attention in August 2008 when he told the Townsville Bulletin newspaper that Mount Isa's gender imbalance made it a good place for "not so attractive" women to live. However, the  revealed that 52.8% of residents were male and 47.2% were female.

In 2015, Mt Isa formed its own Symphony Orchestra, acclaimed as the "most remote in the world". Inaugurated on 23 July 2015, the event attracted several stars of the music world, including world-famous jazz musician James Morrison. Morrison also figured in the premiere of Matthew Dewey's 'Symphony of the Inland Sea', composed for the occasion.

On 5 March 2017, Mount Isa was chosen as a host city of the 2018 Commonwealth Games Queen's Baton Relay, along with Cloncurry, Hughenden, Winton and Birdsville. The baton passed through the Mount Isa CBD and suburbs and regions en route before the opening ceremony on the Gold Coast.

Heritage listings
Mount Isa has a number of heritage-listed sites, including:
 Camooweal Street: Underground Hospital
 Camooweal Street:  Tent House
 6-12 Fifth Avenue: Spinifex State College Junior Campus
 Mount Isa Mining District: Bower Bird Battery
 Mount Isa Mine Lease: Mount Isa Mine Early Infrastructure
 Nettle Street: Casa Grande

Governance
Mount Isa at local level is part of the City of Mount Isa, at state level is part of the electoral district of Mount Isa in the Legislative Assembly of Queensland, and at federal level is part of the Division of Kennedy in the Australian House of Representatives. The mayor of Mount Isa, after the 2020 Local Government Elections, is Danielle Slade.

Economy
Mount Isa's industry is largely dependent on mining. Glencore operates the Mount Isa Mines lease adjacent to the city, which comprises the "Enterprise" underground copper mine, X41 underground copper mine, "Black Star Open Cut" silver-lead zinc mine, and metallurgical processing facilities. Silver-lead-zinc ore is also mined  to the north at Hilton from the "George Fisher" underground mine, and the adjoining "Handlebar Hill" open cut, which is trucked back to Mount Isa for processing.

Mount Isa is in the top two of the largest copper mining and smelting operations in the country.
Copper and lead are smelted on site, with copper anodes and zinc concentrate being transported  to the city and port of Townsville on the east coast. The lead ingots are transported to a refinery in Britain where the silver is extracted. The mine is the most significant landmark in the area, with the stack from the lead smelter (built 1978), standing 270 m tall, visible from all parts of the city and up to  out.

Education 

Mount Isa has eight public primary schools and three private primary schools:
 Happy Valley State School
 Healy State School
 Townview State School
 Barkly Highway State School
 Central State School
 Sunset State School
  Mount Isa School of the Air
 Mount Isa Special School
 St Kieren's (private)
 St Josephs (private)
 
And four high schools:
 Good Shepherd Catholic College (private)
 Mt Isa Flexible Learning Centre (private)
 Mount Isa School of the Air (to grade 10)
 Spinifex State College - Three campuses, Junior from grade 7 to grade 9, Senior from grade 10 to grade 12, and Residential; for students who don't have a high-school in their region and need to leave their place of residence to access years 7–12. Spinifex State College opened on 1 January 2003.  The Junior campus is located at the former Mount Isa State High School.  The Senior campus is located at the former Kalkadoon State High School.  The Mount Isa Education and Training Precinct campus is an amalgamation of Kalkadoon State High School and Mount Isa State High School to form Spinifex State College Precinct.
Mount Isa is also home to the School of the Air, a unique-to-Australia way of schooling isolated students in Australia's vast lightly populated country areas. The city also holds the main campus of the Mount Isa Institute of TAFE, offering courses in a wide range of fields, including mining, agriculture and trades. In addition, James Cook University has a presence, with the Mount Isa Centre for Rural and Remote Health in the Base Hospital complex.

Water infrastructure 

Mount Isa's water is supplied from Lake Moondarra,  from Mount Isa, and from Lake Julius,  from Mount Isa. As it costs approximately twice as much to supply water from Lake Julius, the water is normally drawn from Lake Moondarra. However, during periods of drought, it becomes necessary to draw water supplies from Lake Julius. The three major water users are the Mount Isa Mines, Incitec Pivot and the Mount Isa City Council (which in turn supplies residents and smaller businesses).

Due to a prolonged drought, water levels in Lake Moondarra have become very low. In April 2013, it was forecast that Lake Moondarra would be reduced to 40% of capacity by July 2013, which would trigger the need to supply additional water from Lake Julius. The increased cost to the Mount Isa Council for water was estimated to be $800,000 per year ($114 each for 7000 households). Water restrictions in the town were escalated in April 2013 to reduce water consumption. Boating on Lake Moondarra would be restricted if water levels reduced to 20% for safety reasons as the lower water levels would reveal obstructions. The fish in the lake will be at risk if Lake Moondarra falls to 10% capacity.

Water has traditionally been processed using a natural filtration process involving reed beds in a large isolated lagoon, which, after disinfecting, produced water to acceptable standards under the Australian Drinking Water Guidelines. However, the prolonged drought has produced climatic conditions that have caused blooms of blue-green algae in Lake Moondarra, Lake Julius and the Clear Water Lagoon, necessitating the temporary introduction of a large filtration plant to remove the algae.

Amenities 
The City of Mount Isa operates a public library in Mount Isa at 23 West Street which utilizes a high - speed ISDN Internet Connection (powered through the National Broadband Network) to both Townsville and Brisbane.

Mount Isa also has a cinema complex, situated in the inner city on Rodeo Drive, that contains three air-conditioned cinemas, a skate park/aquatic centre and a multi-purpose sporting complex for basketball and other indoor sports. Mount Isa's events complex, Buchanan Park, opened in May 2007, can hold up to 6,000 people and is used for special events such as concerts and expos. It is also the home of the city's annual show and rodeo.

The city is known for its annual Rodeo and Mardi Gras street parade every August. There is also an annual Multicultural Festival in early September.

The local theater group, the Mount Isa Theatrical Society, also known as MITS, often holds plays and musicals, at least once every few months.

Athletics, gymnastics, tennis, Rugby League, hockey, Football, netball, Rugby Union, cricket and Australian Rules are the most common sports but Shooting, Squash, Softball, Basketball, BMX racing, and Ten-Pin bowling are also present. Mount Isa has a Go Kart Club situated off Duchess Road on the southern side of town.

Tourism 

Attractions include the Hard Times Mine at "Outback at Isa" and The Mount Isa Rodeo and Mardi Gras (held on the same weekend) has given Mount Isa the title of "Rodeo Capital of Australia". The occasion may well triple the city's population in these few days. A memorial has been made especially for the Rodeo, down Rodeo Drive; the sidewalks have special memorials embedded in the cement.

The burial place of John Campbell Miles, the founder of Mount Isa, is on the corner of Rodeo Drive and Miles Street. His ashes are buried underneath a large statue where each panel represents a significant part of Mount Isa. Miles' ashes used to be watched over by a large clock where the statue now stands.

The World War II-era Mount Isa Underground Hospital is an historical building that has been registered on the Register of the National Estate and the Queensland Heritage Register.  It is an air-raid shelter which could function as a hospital.  It was created as a precautionary measure after Darwin was bombed in 1942.  Local miners excavated the site which remains today as the only underground health facility in Queensland which was built during World War II.

Events 
The Mount Isa Rodeo has been held annually since 1959. In addition to the rodeo itself, there are associated street parties, music events, market stalls and family entertainment. The Rodeo Queen Quest raises money for charities; the Rodeo Queen is crowned at the Rodeo Ball. Rodeo school is available for aspiring bull riders.  It is the largest annual rodeo event in the Southern Hemisphere. It is organised by the combined Rotary clubs of Mount Isa. The rodeo often features guest DJing from renowned global DJs including Ste Earley from Doncaster in England who adds to the global party atmosphere. In 2009 as part of the Q150 celebrations, the Mount Isa Rodeo was announced as one of the Q150 Icons of Queensland for its role as an "event and festival".

The Mount Isa parkrun is a 5 km run in Mount Isa. It starts at 7am every Saturday and is free. The event started in 2018 and has attracted tourists from across Queensland and more. The event starts at Tharrapatha Way. As at April 2018, the largest attendance is 102. The event caters for all types of runners of all standards.

The Glencore Mount Isa Lake Moondarra Fishing Classic is held annually, and after 2011 will also be followed by a Fishing, Camping and 4x4 Expo. The Fishing Classic is the richest fresh water fishing event in Queensland. Catching the tagged barramundi fetches the greatest prize money.

Transport
Mount Isa city and surrounds are serviced by a 35 vehicle taxi service. A taxi service known as "Isa-Curry" express transports passengers to and from the neighbouring centre of Cloncurry to Mount Isa and back again, usually for shopping and medical requirements. Additionally, many of the city's clubs have courtesy buses to and from their establishments that run seven days a week and into the early hours of the morning. Mount Isa Coaches is a locally owned and operated coach company that provides tours and charter services to the local community as well as mining, sporting, school and airport transfers. Greyhound Australia has a depot in Mount Isa, with coach services to and from Townsville, Brisbane and (closed due to COVID-19) Tennant Creek.

Mount Isa Airport has regular daily services to Brisbane, Cairns and Townsville, in addition to other services to remote Outback communities in western Queensland. The primary carriers which service Mount Isa and district are Qantas/QantasLink - Brisbane and Townsville; AirNorth - Darwin and Gold Coast; Regional Express - Townsville.  In November 2009, it was announced that Skytrans and Westwing Aviation will commence flights in and out of Mount Isa to and from cities on the coast, commencing in February 2010. Regional Express (REX) also announced flights between Mount Isa and Townsville starting after December 2009. Virgin Australia (VA) began services in August 2012 and offers return services from Brisbane on weekdays.

The city is served by QR passenger train The Inlander, which travels overnight to Townsville twice a week in each direction.

Media

Radio
The following radio stations are available in the Mount Isa region:

 AM 666   4LM         (commercial)
 FM 87.6 Vision Radio (religious)
 FM 88.0 Faith FM (religious)
 FM 100.9 Mob FM      (commercial-70% country)
 FM 101.7 ABC Classic
 FM 102.5 Hit FM (commercial-formerly Hot FM) 
 FM 103.3 TAB Radio   (horse racing)
 FM 104.1 ABC Triple J
 FM 104.9 ABC News Radio
 FM 105.7 Rhema FM (religious)
 FM 106.1 SBS Radio
 FM 106.5 ABC North West
 FM 107.1 ABC Radio National

Television
Five broadcast television services operate in Mount Isa — commercial stations Central Digital
Television (a Network Ten affiliate), Imparja Television (a Nine Network affiliate) and Southern Cross Television (a Seven Network affiliate) (formerly known as ITQ, QQQ, QTV and QSTV - Queensland Satellite Regional Television), along with the Government-owned ABC and SBS. Aboriginal focused channels NITV (National Indigenous Television) and ICTV (Indigenous Community Television) broadcasts on UHF channels 36 and 37.

Digital Television transmissions have commenced in Mount Isa. New channels provided by the ABC and SBS can be received with a digital set top box or digital television. Additional channels from the commercial broadcasters that are available in most other areas of Australia are expected to commence transmission in 2011–2012. Analogue television transmissions will be switched off by 31 December 2013.

Newspapers
The North West Star is a local newspaper which is printed three times per week, Tuesday, Thursday and Saturday.  The Courier-Mail, The Sunday Mail and the Townsville Bulletin are also available.

Climate

Mount Isa experiences a hot semi-arid climate (Köppen: BSh, Trewartha: BShl). The summer/wet season is very hot with highly variable rainfall and humidity owing to the erratic influence of the monsoon. This can be almost non-existent in years like 1985/1986, where as little as  fell from December to March, or extremely intense as in 1973/1974 when  of rain fell over the same period. A typical summer includes numerous hot windy days over 40 °C with clear skies and low humidity, a few weeks of 35-40 °C temperatures with higher humidity and spectacular thunderstorms and a few days with heavy monsoon rain and cooler conditions below 30 °C. Although Mount Isa lies within the tropics, its cool winter nights provide a temperature range similar to subtropical climates.

The winter or dry season is mild to hot and almost completely rainless with median monthly rainfalls from April to September below , though nights can be quite cool and about once every three years a minimum below  is recorded. On rare occasions winter rain-bearing systems may bring heavy rain for a day or two, such as in June 2007, when  of rain was recorded; however, such occurrences happen only every 5 years or less.

Notable people
 Bailey Biondi-Odo, rugby league player
 Russell Bawden, rugby league player
 Simon Black, Australian rules footballer
 Charlie Cameron, Australian rules footballer
 Lindy Chamberlain, wrongly imprisoned for the murder of her baby, which was subsequently attributed to dingo attack. Azaria was also born in Mount Isa. In the movie Evil Angels, made about the incident, Mount Isa appears at the beginning scenes of the movie as the hometown of the Chamberlain family.
 Altiyan Childs, winner of the second season of The X Factor
 Peter Crawford, basketball player
 Gerard Denton, cricketer
 Courtenay Dempsey, Australian rules footballer
 Nathan Fien, rugby league player
 Karen Foxlee, novelist
 Jamie Goddard, rugby league player
 Coen Hess, rugby league player
 Pat Mackie, union leader (1964/5 dispute)
 Simmone Jade Mackinnon, actress
 Deborah Mailman, actress
 Tony McGrady, Speaker of the Legislative Assembly of Queensland and Mayor of Mount Isa
 Ricardo Moffatti, Paralympic swimmer
 Greg Norman, golfer
 Kalyn Ponga, rugby league player
 Nev Power, corporate executive
 Scott Prince, rugby league player
 Pat Rafter, tennis player
 Bill Sweetenham, Olympic swimming coach
 Carl Webb, rugby league player
 John White, squash player

See also

 Mount Isa Mines
 Mount Isa Murders
 Riversleigh

References

External links

Mount Isa City Council
 University of Queensland: Queensland Places: Mount Isa

 
North West Queensland
Towns in Queensland
Mining towns in Queensland
Populated places established in 1923
1923 establishments in Australia
Queensland in World War II
City of Mount Isa